, formerly known as , was a Japanese video game developer founded in 1980. ADK began as a developer of arcade games and is best known for their library of SNK Neo Geo titles, including for its home consoles, produced in partnership with SNK. Most notable among these are their fighting games and, in particular, the World Heroes series and Aggressors of Dark Kombat. The company closed with properties sold to SNK Playmore in 2003.

History

Early years
ADK was founded in July 1980 in Ageo, Saitama, Japan. At the time, it was known as Alpha Denshi or Alpha for short. Originally a producer of audio and telecommunications equipment, Alpha first ventured into video games in 1980 with two arcade titles:  by Craul Denshi and Tehkan's , a basic Japanese chess game. Dorachan was recalled shortly after release due to unlicensed usage of the fictional character Doraemon.

Despite an inauspicious start, Alpha continued to develop arcade games in 1981. , published by Sanritsu Giken Corp, was one of the earliest arcade Mahjong titles and helped Alpha to establish themselves in the industry. That same year, Craul Denshi released Alpha's Crush Roller (Make Trax), a maze game similar to Pac-Man. By 1982, Alpha was able to finance their own independent development of Talbot, another maze game, which they licensed to Volt Electronics for distribution. In 1983, Alpha expanded into sports games with their self-published Exciting Soccer and two Champion Baseball titles for Sega. Alpha would produce several more games for Sega through the mid 1980s while continuing to publish others on their own.

Partnership with SNK
Alpha Denshi began developing games almost exclusively for SNK hardware in 1987. In 1990, SNK was developing a new unified video game platform for both the home and arcades. Alpha was a close partner in the process and contributed much of the hardware design for what would eventually become the Neo Geo. The 1990 Neo Geo arcade launch lineup included two Alpha titles: Magician Lord and Ninja Combat. Magician Lord was also later included as a pack-in game for the 1991 home console, the Neo Geo AES.

In 1992, following the revitalization of the fighting game genre by Capcom's Street Fighter II, Alpha developed World Heroes with assistance from SNK. It would go on to sell over 200,000 copies that year, and its popularity quickly spawned multiple sequels. In 1993, Alpha Denshi shortened its name to ADK, short for Alpha Denshi Kabushiki gaisha (Japanese for "share company"). Shortly thereafter, ADK agreed to become an exclusive developer for SNK. In 1994, SNK launched the CD-ROM-based version of the Neo Geo, the Neo Geo CD. ADK soon began porting their existing library to the new platform. In addition, ADK developed three new exclusive titles for the Neo Geo CD: Crossed Swords II, ADK World and ZinTrick.

In the late 1990s, newer fifth generation consoles with 3D graphics and CD audio were becoming more popular with consumers and an attractive target for video game developers. Still under exclusive contract, ADK was only allowed to develop two Sega Saturn ports: World Heroes Perfect and Twinkle Star Sprites, both published by SNK. Meanwhile, SNK released the short-lived Neo Geo Pocket and Pocket Color handhelds in 1998 and 1999. ADK developed only eight titles for the platform which was dwarfed in sales by Nintendo's Game Boy Color and lasted less than three years.

During this same time, the developer Miraisoft released two Sony PlayStation games with ADK included in the credits. This aroused suspicion at the time because while Miraisoft was officially listed as an "affiliate company" of ADK, ADK was still under exclusive contract with SNK and could not release PlayStation games themselves. While no further link between the two companies was publicly announced, it has been suspected that ADK used the affiliate brand to circumvent SNK's terms. In any event, ADK continued to develop Neo Geo games until 2001 when SNK declared bankruptcy.

Final years
ADK was already facing financial difficulty and had reduced its workforce prior to SNK's demise. In 2000, ADK released its last video game title, Dynamite Slugger, and was primarily focused on developing content for Japanese i-mode-based mobile devices. A variety of content was developed spanning informational, social networking and digital pet sites. However, ADK could not reverse their fortunes and ultimately declared bankruptcy in 2003. By this time, the successor to SNK, SNK Playmore, had already been established and was actively producing video games. Soon after the bankruptcy, SNK Playmore bought up ADK's relinquished intellectual properties, including ADK trademark.

Legacy
To this day, ADK characters are still known to occasionally appear in SNK Playmore games. First, in 2005, SNK released a sequel to ADK's Twinkle Star Sprites, called Twinkle Star Sprites - La Petite Princesse for the PlayStation 2. In that same year came Neo Geo Battle Coliseum, a console and arcade fighting game featuring several characters from the World Heroes and Aggressors of Dark Kombat franchises. In 2008, SNK released a compilation of five classic ADK Neo Geo titles for the PlayStation 2 titled  (lit. "ADK Spirits").
In 2019, Jeanne D'Arc, one of the characters from the World Heroes series has appeared as playable DLC character in SNK Heroines: Tag Team Frenzy.

List of products
The following lists ADK-developed titles by platform of earliest release. Third-party publishers are also noted.

Early arcade games
 Dorachan (1980, Craul Denshi)
 Shogi (1980, Tehkan)
 Janputer (1981, Sanritsu Giken)
 Jump Bug (1981, contracted by Hoei Sangyo, published by Sega)
 Crush Roller / Make Trax (1981, Craul Denshi)
 Talbot (1982)
 Exciting Soccer (1983)
 Champion Baseball (1983, Sega)
 Champion Baseball II (1983, Sega)
 Bull Fighter (1984, Sega)
 Equites (1984, Sega)
 Exciting Soccer II (1985)
 High Voltage (1985)
 Perfect Janputer (1985)
 The Koukou Yakyū (lit. "The High School Baseball") (1985)
 Splendor Blast (1985)
 Super Stingray (1986, Sega)
 Kyros No Yakata / Kyros (1986)
 Time Soldiers / Battle Field (1987, SNK)
 Sky Soldiers (1988, SNK)
 Gang Wars (1989, SNK)
 Sky Adventure (1989, SNK)
 Super Champion Baseball (1989, SNK) [formally titled as Kaettekita Champion Baseball]

NES
 STED: Iseki Wakusei no Yabou (1990, K Amusement Leasing/KAC)

Neo Geo
 Magician Lord (1990, SNK)
 Ninja Combat (1990, SNK)
 Sun Shine / Block Paradise (1990, unreleased)
 Blue's Journey / Raguy (1990, SNK)
 Thrash Rally (1991, SNK, Rally Chase on NGCD)
 Crossed Swords (1991, SNK)
 Fun Fun Bros (1991, unreleased)
 Mystic Wand (1991, unreleased)
 Ninja Commando (1992, SNK)
 World Heroes (1992, assisted by and published with SNK)
 World Heroes 2 (1993, assisted by and published with SNK)
 Aggressors of Dark Kombat (1994, SNK)
 World Heroes 2 Jet (1994, SNK)
 Shōgi no Tatsujin: Master of Syougi (1995, SNK)
 World Heroes Perfect (1995, SNK)
 Ninja Master's: Haō Ninpō Chō (1996, SNK)
 Over Top (1996)
 Twinkle Star Sprites (1996, SNK)
 Dance RhythMIX (2002, unreleased)

Neo Geo CD
All released Neo Geo titles were also ported to Neo Geo CD.
 Crossed Swords II (1995)
 ADK World (1995)
 ZinTrick (1996, SNK)

Hyper Neo Geo 64
 Beast Busters: Second Nightmare (1998, SNK)

PlayStation
 Treasure Gear (1997, as Miraisoft)
 Star Monja (1998, as Miraisoft, published by GMF)

Neo Geo Pocket
 Melon Chan no Seichō Nikki ("Melon-chan's Growth Diary") (1998, SNK)
 Shōgi no Tatsujin: Master of Syougi (1998, SNK)

Neo Geo Pocket Color
 Crush Roller (1999, SNK)
 Dokodemo Mahjong (1999, SNK)
 Neo Poke Pro Yakyū (1999, SNK)
 Party Mail (1999, SNK)
 Shōgi no Tatsujin: Master of Syougi Color (1999, SNK)
 Dynamite Slugger (2000, SNK), a baseball video game with twelve international teams to pick from.

References

External links
 The History of ADK at Jap-Sai.com
 

 ADK Game Developer Research Institute

SNK
SNK Playmore
ADK (company) games
Video game development companies
Video game companies established in 1980
Video game companies disestablished in 2003
Companies that have filed for bankruptcy in Japan
Defunct video game companies of Japan
Companies based in Saitama Prefecture
Japanese companies established in 1980
Japanese companies disestablished in 2003